Castelo de Torre de Moncorvo is a 13th-century castle in Torre de Moncorvo, Bragança District, Portugal. It is classified by IGESPAR as a Site of Public Interest.

Torre de Moncorvo
Castles in Bragança District